Imma viola is a moth in the family Immidae. It was described by Pagenstecher in 1886. It is found on the Aru Islands.

The wingspan is about 17 mm. The forewings are brownish-black with a strong violet tinge and white fringes. The hindwings are black up to a white stripe in the center of the wing.

References

Moths described in 1886
Immidae
Moths of Indonesia